Amber Balcaen (born March 7, 1992) is a Canadian professional stock car racing driver. She competes part-time in the ARCA Menards Series, driving the No. 15 Toyota Camry for Venturini Motorsports. She is most known for being the first Canadian woman to win in a NASCAR-sanctioned race in the United States.

Racing career

Early career 
Balcaen began racing at ten years old, driving go-karts in several dirt tracks around North Dakota. At sixteen years old, she bought her first lightning sprint car and became the first female driver to win in a dirt track racing championship in Manitoba.

Amber made her Northern Outlaw Sprint Association debut in 2014, for a full-time schedule. She won Rookie of the Year that season.

Chili Bowl Nationals 
Balcaen competed in the 2015 Chili Bowl Nationals.

NASCAR Whelen All-American Series 
Balcaen got the attention of the NASCAR Drive for Diversity program and drove in the 2016 NASCAR Whelen All-American Series (now NASCAR Advance Auto Parts Weekly Series). That year, she made history as she became the first female Canadian driver to win a NASCAR-sanctioned race in the United States, winning at Motor Mile Speedway. She earned eleven top fives in her first season, giving her Rookie of the Year honors. She went on to win at the same track a year later, getting her second overall series win.

NASCAR K&N Pro Series East 
Balcaen made her NASCAR K&N Pro Series East debut in 2017, driving at New Smyrna Speedway for Martin-McClure Racing. She started 21st and finished 20th, after getting involved in a late race wreck. She had a spark plug wire come off her car, which resulted in a penalty, putting her six laps down.

CARS Super Late Model Tour 
Balcaen made her first start in the CARS Super Late Model Tour in 2018, driving the No. 4 for Kyle Busch Motorsports at Hickory Motor Speedway. Balcaen started 26th and finished 28th, after being involved in an early race wreck.

On March 21, Kyle Busch Motorsports announced that Balcaen will drive two late model races in 2019, the Pro All Star Series race at Hickory Motor Speedway, and the CARS Super Late Model Tour race at Motor Mile Speedway. Balcaen started 22nd finished 14th at Motor Mile.

POWRi Midget Racing 
In 2020, she competed in the POWRi Midget Racing Series, failing to qualify for most of the races. She was only able to qualify for two races, finishing 22nd and 12th respectably. On July 11, 2020, Balcaen was involved in a serious wreck at the Valley Speedway, after she got loose in turn 4, causing her sprint car to go off course, and flip multiple times into a fence. Balcaen suffered collapsed lungs, a severe concussion, and several burns to her arms. She was immediately taken to a local hospital for further evaluation. She wasn't released for three days, and had her racing career put on hold for about three months.

ARCA Menards Series West 
Balcaen made her first ARCA Menards Series West start for Bill McAnally Racing at Irwindale Speedway in 2021, finishing 15th. She made two more starts that season, finishing 11th and 22nd at Irwindale and Las Vegas respectively.

ARCA Menards Series 
On January 3, 2022, Rette Jones Racing announced Balcaen would run the full upcoming ARCA Menards Series season. She would earn six top tens throughout the season, and finish 7th in the final point standings. On January 12, 2023, it was announced that Balcaen will join Venturini Motorsports for the 2023 season, running the races at Daytona and Talladega.

Personal life 
Balcaen was the co-host of the TV series "Car's of Rock" with AC/DC band member, Brian Johnson. She is also a motivational speaker, who is currently helping other people from around the world achieve their goals in life. In 2019, she was a main cast member of the NASCAR reality show, Racing Wives, on CMT. She was a spokesperson for Canada's biggest automotive company, Kal Tire, during a winter campaign.

Filmography

Television

Motorsports career results

ARCA Menards Series 
(key) (Bold – Pole position awarded by qualifying time. Italics – Pole position earned by points standings or practice time. * – Most laps led.)

ARCA Menards Series East 
(key) (Bold – Pole position awarded by qualifying time. Italics – Pole position earned by points standings or practice time. * – Most laps led.)

ARCA Menards Series West

References

External links 

1992 births
Living people
ARCA Menards Series drivers
Canadian racing drivers
NASCAR drivers
Racing drivers from Manitoba
Sportspeople from Winnipeg
Canadian female racing drivers